The Algerian Championnat National 2 season 2001-02.

League table

Groupe Est

References

Algerian Ligue 2 seasons
2001–02 in Algerian football
Algeria